Fingerprints: The Best of Powderfinger, 1994–2000 is a greatest hits album by Australian alternative rock band Powderfinger, released on 30 October 2004 in Australia.

The album contained tracks from the Powderfinger's first four albums, as well as two previously unreleased songs, "Bless My Soul" and "Process This". "Bless My Soul" was also released as a single.  On 17 February 2009, Fingerprints was released in the United States with an alternate track listing including more recent songs and discarding older songs to align with releases that had previously been released in the US.  The album was released on the back of the band's success on the TV show, Grey's Anatomy, which featured two songs from the album "Dream Days at the Hotel Existence".

Recording and production 
Prior to the release of Fingerprints: The Best of Powderfinger, 1994–2000, there was some talk of the idea that a best of album would be a mistake by the band, as they were generally seen as the "end of an artist's creative haul". Australian Music Online, publishing a Universal Music Australia press release, said these fears were not justified, and that the album would be "a Powderfinger biography that really tells the story better than anyone can on paper".

MTV Scene writer Craig Tangsley also commented on fears about the "death" of the band, stating that he spoke to Bernard Fanning about the band's death as "it's inevitable to talk when someone releases a best of album". Fanning denied that the band was finished, instead claiming that Fingerprints: The Best of Powderfinger, 1994–2000 was spawned due to a deal with the band's record label. He also assured readers that the band had another album planned.

Ciao reviewer cocoklo agreed with Universal's assessment, stating that "If there ever was a band, in my opinion, that needed a greatest hits album, it's Powderfinger". However, he noted another issue which had some influence on the production of the album - the issue of which songs to include. As the band had only released five albums, they were forced to mostly include the singles they had previously released.

Throughout production stages, the album was not referred to as Fingerprints: The Best of Powderfinger, 1994–2000, but rather by its alternative title; From Heavy Metal to Centenary Medal. It is unknown when the band decided on the final title of the album.

Album and single releases 
Fingerprints: The Best of Powderfinger, 1994–2000 was released on 30 October 2004 in Australia, and entered the ARIA chart on 14 November that year. It spent 17 weeks, peaking at #2 for one week. The album was certified double platinum. "Bless My Soul", the only single released from the album, failed to chart. It did, however, appear on the Triple J Hottest 100 in 2004, at position #9. "Process This", which was not released as a single, appeared at #68.

Response 
Fingerprints: The Best of Powderfinger, 1994–2000 was received well by reviewers. Sputnikmusic contributor Nandrucu gave the album a perfect five, describing it as "perfect way to introduce you" to the band. New song "Bless My Soul" was seen in a positive light, with the comment "it has a great opening, with neat little guitar fills popping up all over the place". However, the reviewer dislike "Process This", stating the song had "a try-hard feel about it".

Soulshine reviewer Dave Hardwick gave the album three stars, stating that "the cynic in me can't help asking whether that is the point"; alluding to the overbearing presence of industry politics regarding the release of a Best of collection, and complaining of a lack of surprises in the choice of tracks. However, he agreed that the album was a good starting point for "those new to the band".

Ciao reviewer cocoklo rated the album positively. The new songs on the album were praised, with the comment "both of which are stunning", and stating that none of the songs were disappointing. The review highly recommended the album, and again stated that it was an excellent introduction to the band. Fasterlouder.com.au commentator Elissa said the album contained an excellent selection of songs that represented "essence of the band from its signature melodies", and said that "Bless My Soul" was set "to become a Powderfinger favourite".

Track listing 
Unlike many 'Greatest Hits' projects, Powderfinger did not include notable singles Good-Day Ray, The Metre, Take Me In or any single from their first album, Parables for Wooden Ears, including instead fan favorites, Thrilloilogy, Belter and Sink Low.
 "Bless My Soul" – 4:06 (Previously unreleased)
 "My Happiness" – 4:36 (Odyssey Number Five)
 "Waiting for the Sun" – 3:54 (Odyssey Number Five)
 "Pick You Up" – 4:19 (Double Allergic)
 "Passenger" – 4:20 (Internationalist)
 "Don't Wanna Be Left Out" – 2:12 (Internationalist)
 "These Days" – 4:36 (Two Hands version)
 "The Day You Come" – 3:58 (Internationalist)
 "D.A.F." – 3:30 (Double Allergic)
 "My Kind of Scene" – 4:37 (Odyssey Number Five)
 "Like a Dog" – 4:20 (Odyssey Number Five)
 "Already Gone" – 3:28 (Internationalist)
 "Process This" – 3:22 (Previously unreleased)
 "Belter" – 4:13 (Internationalist)
 "Living Type" – 3:25 (Double Allergic)
 "Thrilloilogy" – 6:10 (Odyssey Number Five)
 "Sink Low" – 2:12 (Parables for Wooden Ears)

US track listing 
 "My Happiness" – 4:36 (Odyssey Number Five)
 "Lost and Running" - 3:42 (Dream Days at the Hotel Existence)
 "Love Your Way" - 4:31 (Vulture Street)
 "These Days" – 4:36 (Two Hands version)
 "Waiting for the Sun" – 3:54 (Odyssey Number Five)
 "(Baby I've Got You) On My Mind" - 3:20 (Vulture Street)
 "Sunsets" - 3:49 (Vulture Street)
 "My Kind of Scene" – 4:37 (Odyssey Number Five)
 "Stumblin'" - 3:46 (Vulture Street)
 "Drifting Further Away" - 3:40 (Dream Days at the Hotel Existence)
 "Passenger" – 4:20 (Internationalist)
 "Nobody Sees" - 4:14 (Dream Days at the Hotel Existence)

Charts

Weekly charts

Year-end charts

Certifications

Notes 

Powderfinger albums
2004 greatest hits albums